Several military services have combat engineer service corps:

 Canadian Military Engineers
 Indian Army Corps of Engineers
 Indonesian Army Corps of Engineers
 Irish Army Engineer Corps
 Israeli Engineering Corps
 Pakistan Army Corps of Engineers
 Royal Australian Engineers
 Royal Engineers (British Army)
 United States Army Corps of Engineers
 Rapid Engineer Deployable Heavy Operational Repair Squadron Engineers (United States Air Force)
 Naval Facilities Engineering Command (United States Navy)
 Seabee (United States Navy)

See also
Corps of Engineers (disambiguation)